Shanks House in Cucklington, Somerset, England is a Grade I listed building.

The first written records of the house date from the middle of the 16th century.

During the 20th century it has been owned by the Sutton and Morley families

The two-story house with attics underwent major works in the 17th and 18th centuries, including refitting by Nathaniel Ireson.

See also

 List of Grade I listed buildings in South Somerset

References

Houses completed in the 17th century
Grade I listed buildings in South Somerset
Grade I listed houses in Somerset